The Oliver 1900 row-crop tractor was built between 1960 and 1964 by the Oliver Farm Equipment Company. The 1900 was a heavy, powerful tractor, built in three series.

Description and production
The Oliver 1900 was a standard-type tractor, with wide-set front wheels. It was powered by supercharged General Motors 4-53a  displacement four-cylinder diesel engine. The initial A series was built in 1960-61. It was succeeded in 1962 by the B series, with increased power, a swap from a 2 valve per cylinder head in the engine to 4 valves per cylinder and an option for four-wheel drive. The C series improved the operator's station and incorporated hydraulic power steering. Early tractors used only a six-speed transmission, with a shaft directly from the engine to the transmission. Later, a shift on the go unit bolted directly to the rear of the engine, know as the “hydra-power drive” was offered, along with the standard 6 speed. The tractor was marketed in Wheatland, Row-Crop and Rice Tire versions. The 1964 price was about $9,000.

References

1900
Vehicles introduced in 1960